Since World War I Puerto Ricans and people of Puerto Rican descent have participated in every conflict in which the United States has been involved as members of the United States Armed Forces. The following nine Puerto Ricans, including those of Puerto Rican descent, have made the ultimate sacrifice and were posthumously awarded the nation's highest military decoration – the Medal of Honor. The Medal of Honor is bestowed "for conspicuous gallantry and intrepidity at the risk of life, above and beyond the call of duty, in actual combat against an armed enemy force." The medal is awarded by the President of the United States on behalf of the Congress.

PFC Fernando Luis García was the first Puerto Rican and the only one who was a member of the United States Marine Corps to have been awarded the Medal of Honor for his actions during the Korean War. The other eight were members of the United States Army and were awarded the medal for their actions during the Korean War or the Vietnam War.

On March 18, 2014, President Barack Obama posthumously awarded the Medal of Honor to Félix Conde Falcón, Juan Negrón, Demensio Rivera and Miguel Vera. The total of Puerto Rican soldiers awarded the Medal of Honor increased to a total of nine.

Medal of Honor

The Medal of Honor was created during the American Civil War and is the highest military decoration presented by the United States government to a member of its armed forces. The recipient must have distinguished themselves at the risk of their own life above and beyond the call of duty in action against an enemy of the United States. Due to the nature of this medal, it is commonly presented posthumously.

Korean War

Fernando Luis García
PFC Fernando Luis García*  (October 14, 1929 – September 5, 1952), born in Utuado, Puerto Rico, was a member of the United States Marines and the first Puerto Rican who was awarded the Medal of Honor.

Medal of Honor citation:

In memory:

PFC Fernando Luis Garcia's remains were never recovered. There is a headstone with Garcia's name in the Puerto Rico National Cemetery in the city of Bayamon, Puerto Rico.

Juan E. Negrón

Master Sergeant Juan E. Negron*, (September 26, 1929 – March 29, 1996) born in Corozal, Puerto Rico, was posthumously awarded the Medal of Honor on March 18, 2014, for his courageous actions while serving as a member of Company L, 65th Infantry Regiment, 3rd Infantry Division during combat operations against an armed enemy in Kalma-Eri, Korea on April 28, 1951.

Medal of Honor citation:

In memory:

On March 29, 1996, Negrón died in Bayamon, Puerto Rico. He was buried with military honors in Plot: J 0 3180 of the Puerto Rico National Cemetery located in the city of Bayamon.

Demensio Rivera

Private Demensio Rivera*, (April 28, 1932 – March 19, 1964) born in Cabo Rojo, Puerto Rico, was posthumously awarded the Medal of Honor on March 18, 2014, for his courageous actions while serving as an automatic rifleman with 2d Platoon, Company G, 7th Infantry Regiment, 3d Infantry Division during combat operations against an armed enemy in Changyong-ni, Korea on May 23, 1951.

Medal of Honor citation:

In memory:
Rivera was residing in New York City where he died on March 19, 1967. His body was transferred to Puerto Rico. He was buried with full military honors in section C row K-184 at the Cementerio San Miguel Arcangel located in Carretera PR-308, Parcelas Puerto Real, Cabo Rojo.

Miguel Armando Vera

Private Miguel Armando Vera* (May 3, 1932 – September 21, 1952) born in Adjuntas, Puerto Rico was posthumously awarded the Medal of Honor on March 18, 2014, for his courageous actions while serving as an automatic rifleman with Company F, 38th Infantry Regiment, 2nd Infantry Division in Chorwon, Korea, on September 21, 1952.

Medal of Honor citation:

In memory:

Vera's body was transferred to Puerto Rico where he was buried with full military honors in the Utuado Municipal Cemetery, Utuado, Puerto Rico. On November 20, 2014, the remains of Korean War hero, Pvt. Vera, were moved and laid to rest at Arlington National Cemetery. The military burial ceremony took place eight months after he was upgraded to the Medal of Honor more than 60 years after he was killed in action.

Vietnam War

Carlos James Lozada
PFC Carlos James Lozada* (September 6, 1946 – November 20, 1967), born in Caguas, Puerto Rico, was a member of Company A, 2nd Battalion, 503d Infantry of the 173d Airborne Brigade, United States Army who was killed in action in Vietnam and was posthumously awarded the Medal of Honor.

Medal of Honor citation:

In memory:

PFC Lozada was buried with full military honors in Long Island National Cemetery located in Farmingdale, New York. His name is located in the Vietnam Veterans Memorial Wall Panel 30E-Row 045. His name is also inscribed in "El Monumento de la Recordación" (Monument of Remembrance), dedicated to Puerto Rico's fallen soldiers and situated in front of the Capitol Building in San Juan, Puerto Rico. The Bronx honored him by naming a playground in his honor located behind 175 Willis Ave.

Félix Conde Falcón

Staff Sergeant Felix M. Conde-Falcon* (February 28, 1938 – April 4, 1969) born in Juncos, Puerto Rico was posthumously awarded the Medal of Honor on March 18, 2014, for his courageous actions while serving as an acting Platoon Leader in Company D, 1st Battalion, 505th Infantry Regiment, 3d Brigade, 82d Airborne Division during combat operations against an armed enemy in Ap Tan Hoa, Republic of Vietnam on April 4, 1969.

Medal of Honor citation:

Postscript:
His Medal of Honor was an upgrade made on March 18, 2014, to his Distinguished Service Cross Medal.

Eurípides Rubio

Capt. Eurípides Rubio* (March 1, 1938 – November 8, 1966), born in Ponce, Puerto Rico, was a United States Army captain.  Rubio was a member of the U.S. Army, H&H Co., 1st Battalion, 28th Infantry, 1st Infantry Division, RVN.

Medal of Honor citation:

In memory:

The U.S. Army Reserve Center in the Puerto Nuevo sector of San Juan, PR was named after Captain Eurípides Rubio. The Department of Veterans Affairs Outpatient Clinic in Ponce, PR was also named in memory of Captain Eurípides Rubio. Capt. Eurípides Rubio's name is inscribed in "El Monumento de la Recordación" (Monument of Remembrance), dedicated to Puerto Rico's fallen soldiers and situated in front of the Capitol Building in San Juan, Puerto Rico. The name Eurípides Rubio is inscribed on the Vietnam Veterans Memorial ("The Wall") on Panel 12E, Row 044. His remains are buried in the Puerto Rico National Cemetery in the city of Bayamon, Puerto Rico – Section HSA, Site 5.

Héctor Santiago-Colón

Specialist Four Héctor Santiago-Colón* (December 20, 1942 – June 28, 1968) was born in Salinas, Puerto Rico. Santiago-Colon was a member of the U.S. Army, Company B, 5th Battalion, 7th Cavalry, 1st Cavalry Division. He was posthumously presented with the Medal of Honor, during the Vietnam War for saving the lives of his comrades.

Medal of Honor citation:

In memory:

In July 1975, The Puerto Rican National Guard renamed their base "Camp Salinas", which is located close to Santiago-Colón's birth town, with the name "Camp Santiago" in his honor. He was the second Puerto Rican to be so honored. The first Puerto Rican who has a base named after him is Marine PFC Fernando Luis García.  Santiago-Colón's name on the Vietnam Veterans Memorial is located at Panel 54W Line 013.  Santiago-Colón's name is also inscribed in "El Monumento de la Recordación" (Monument of Remembrance), dedicated to Puerto Rico's fallen soldiers and situated in front of the Capitol Building in San Juan, Puerto Rico. His remains are buried in the Cementerio Municipal de Salinas – Salinas, Puerto Rico.

Humbert Roque Versace
Captain Humbert Roque Versace* (July 2, 1937 – September 26, 1965) born in Honolulu, Hawaii, was a United States Army Captain of Puerto Rican-Italian descent who was awarded the United States' highest military decoration – the Medal of Honor – for his heroic actions while a prisoner of war (POW) during the Vietnam War. He was the first member of the U.S. Army to be awarded the Medal of Honor for actions performed while in captivity in Southeast Asia.

Medal of Honor citation:

In memory:

On July 9, 2002, Secretary of the Army Thomas E. White and Army Chief of Staff General Eric K. Shinseki inducted Versace into the Pentagon Hall of Heroes. Versace's capture and execution was chronicled in the book Five Years to Freedom by Nick Rowe.

There is a statue with the likeness of Versace located in the Rocky Versace Plaza, made possible with a donation of $125,000 raised by the citizens of Alexandria, Virginia. On Memorial Day of 2007, Versace's name was inscribed in Puerto Rico's monument "El Monumento de la Recordacion". Versace's remains have never been recovered. His headstone at Arlington National Cemetery stands above an empty grave and can be located in the Memorial section MG-108.

El Monumento de la Recordación

The names of the first four Puerto Rican Medal of Honor recipients were among the original inscriptions in El Monumento de la Recordación (English: Monument of Remembrance) which is dedicated to the Puerto Ricans (both those who were born in the island and/or those who were born elsewhere, but are of Puerto Rican descent) who have fallen in combat as members of the Armed Forces of the United States.  Versace's inscription was subsequently unveiled by then-Senate president Kenneth McClintock and then-Speaker José Aponte. The monument, an initiative of then-Senate Majority Leader Charlie Rodríguez, erected during the Senate presidency of Roberto Rexach Benítez, is located in front of the Capitol Building of Puerto Rico in San Juan.  There are paintings of each of the first four Puerto Rican Medal of Honor recipients, by the late Cuban-Venezuelan artist Estrella Díaz, inside the Capitol Building in Puerto Rico.

Medal of Honor photo gallery

See also

 List of Puerto Ricans-Military
 Puerto Rican recipients of the Distinguished Service Cross
 Puerto Rican recipients of the Navy Cross
 List of Hispanic Medal of Honor recipients
 El Grito de Lares
 Intentona de Yauco
 List of Puerto Ricans
 List of Puerto Rican military personnel
 Military history of Puerto Rico
 Puerto Rican Campaign
 Puerto Ricans in World War I
 Puerto Ricans in World War II
 Puerto Ricans in the Vietnam War
 Puerto Ricans Missing in Action - Korean War
 Puerto Ricans Missing in Action - Vietnam War
 Puerto Rican Nationalist Party Revolts of the 1950s
 Puerto Rican women in the military
 65th Infantry Regiment
 Puerto Rican recipients of the Presidential Medal of Freedom
 Puerto Rican recipients of the Presidential Citizens Medal

Notes
 N.B. An asterisk after the name indicates that the award was given posthumously.

References

Further reading
 Puertorriquenos Who Served With Guts, Glory, and Honor. Fighting to Defend a Nation Not Completely Their Own; by : Greg Boudonck; 
 Historia militar de Puerto Rico; by: Hector Andres Negroni; publisher=Sociedad Estatal Quinto Centenario (1992); 

Puerto Rican
Medal of Honor recipients
Puerto Rican military personnel
 
Military in Puerto Rico